The Outlandish Knight may refer to:

Lady Isabel and the Elf Knight, a variant of this ballad is titled The Outlandish Knight
The Outlandish Knight (novel), a 1999 historical novel by Richard Adams